Godinton House (also known as Godinton House and Gardens or Godinton Park) is a stately home in the parish of Great Chart, owned by a non-profit-making trust.

Description 
Godinton House is an ancient brick house with a Jacobean-style exterior. The roof has a distinctive system of Dutch gables (also called semi-classical gables). The Jacobean house was built around a medieval great hall. Of particular note is the elaborate carvings in chestnut wood on the main staircase.

The gardens include one of the longest Yew hedges in England, as well as having spectacular displays of delphiniums, irises, wild flowers and roses.

The house also has a Steinway piano.

It hosts one of the best private collections of porcelain in the South of England.

History 
Godinton House was the seat of the Toke family for about 455 years from 1440 to 1895.

Around the turn of the century (19th/20th) then owner Mr. Ashley Dodd hired the architect Sir Reginald Blomfield to update the house and redesign the gardens. Blomfield planted the famous yew hedge, shaped to repeat the gable form seen on the house.

In 1991 Major Alan Wyndham-Green, the last owner of Godinton, established the Godinton House Preservation Trust. Since Major Wyndham-Green's passing in 1996 the Trust has continued to preserve, restore, and enhance the house and parklands.

References

External links 
 Official website: Godinton House and Gardens
Godinton House Preservation Trust (www.charity-commission.gov.uk - Charity No. 1002278)
 "Godinton House: The Gardens" Photographic website by Hedley Grenfell-Banks.
 The Account Book of a Kentish Estate 1616-1704, Edited by Eleanor Constance Lodge (1927)
 A Saunter Through Kent with Pen and Pencil, Vol. 2, by Sir Charles Igglesden (1900) (Google Books)
 Video of Godinton including drone fly overs.

Further reading 

The Account Book of a Kentish Estate 1616-1704, Edited by  Eleanor Constance Lodge (1927). This book features a comprehensive introduction by Eleanor C. Lodge analysing an ancient Toke account book. She describes life at Godinton (and county Kent in general) in the seventeenth century.
[https://books.google.com/books?id=29lAAQAAMAAJ&q=A+Saunter+Through+Kent+with+Pen+and+Pencil,+Vol.+2 Saunter Through Kent with Pen and Pencil, Vol. 2], by Sir Charles Igglesden (1900). Originally published at the Offices of the Kentish Express'', Ashford, Kent. The chapter about Godinton is a unique coverage. It includes fascinating stories, including traditional local gossip, about murder, intrigue, ghosts, secret rooms, and secret passages. The description of the house and garden is beautifully written.
"Godinton, Kent, the seat of Mr. G. Ashley Dodd"  Country Life Magazine, London, July 18, 1903, pp. 90–98.
"Godinton, Kent, the seat of Mr. George Ashley Dodd" Country Life Magazine, London, May 11, 1907, pp. 666–673.
"GODINTON PARK, KENT - I, The Home of Mr. Alan Wyndham-Green" By Christopher Hussey, Country Life Magazine, London, December 6, 1962, pp. 1396–1400.
"GODINTON PARK, KENT - II, The Home of Mr. Alan Wyndham-Green" By Christopher Hussey, Country Life Magazine, London, December 13, 1962, pp. 1546–1549.
"GODINTON PARK, KENT - III, The Home of Mr. Alan Wyndham-Green" By Christopher Hussey, Country Life Magazine, London, December 20, 1962, pp. 1600–1603.
"Painted Catalogue" (letter), Country Life Magazine, London, December 27, 1962, page 1662. This letter concerns the famous painting, "The Last Day in the Old Home" (1862) by Robert Braithwaite Martineau. The painting is on display at the Tate Britain. The setting in this painting is a composite of rooms at Godinton (including Toke family crests).

Country houses in Kent
Grade I listed houses in Kent
Historic house museums in Kent
Gardens in Kent